"Invisible" is a song by Irish boy band D-Side, released as the third single (second in the United Kingdom) from their first studio album, Stronger Together (2003). The song was written and produced by Desmond Child, Andreas Carlsson, and Chris Braide. Released on 14 July 2003, the song became a top-10 hit in Ireland and the United Kingdom, peaking at number five in the former country and number seven in the latter. The same year, American Idol second two runner-up Clay Aiken covered the song and reached number 37 on the US Billboard Hot 100 with his rendition. The song has been frequently targeted by music critics for its unsettling lyrical content, with several calling the track a "stalkers' anthem".

Release and reception
D-Side's version of "Invisible" was released on 14 July 2003. Can't Stop the Pop called it a "meticulously crafted" track, praising its composition, the band's vocals, and its airplay appeal, but criticised the lyrical content for being too "creepy", noting that the chorus has aged poorly. Commercially, "Invisible" became the group's third consecutive top-10 hit in their home country, debuting and peaking at number five on the Irish Singles Chart on 17 July 2003. At the end of 2003, the song was placed at number 73 on Ireland's year-end chart. On 20 July, the single appeared at number seven on the UK Singles Chart, becoming D-Side's highest-charting single in the UK and staying in the top 100 for six weeks.

Track listings

UK and European CD1
 "Invisible" (radio edit)
 "Fallen for You"
 "Bring You Out"
 "Invisible" (radio edit video)

UK CD2
 "Invisible" (radio edit)
 "Invisible" (Lifestylerz radio edit)
 "Invisible" (Lifestylerz dub)
 "Invisible" (Lifestylerz radio edit video)

UK cassette single and European CD2
 "Invisible" (radio edit)
 "Fallen for You"

Japanese CD single
 "Invisible" (radio edit)
 "Fallen for You"
 "Bring You Out"
 "Invisible" (Lifestylerz radio edit)

Personnel
Personnel are lifted from the UK CD1 liner notes.
 Desmond Child – writing, production
 Andreas Carlsson – writing, production
 Chris Braide – writing, production
 D-Side – vocals
 Carlos Alvarez – mixing

Charts

Weekly charts

Year-end charts

Clay Aiken version

After finishing as runner-up to the second season of American Idol, Clay Aiken covered the song for his debut studio album, Measure of a Man, and released it as the album's lead single. This version was produced by Child only and contains an extended bridge. Released two months after D-Side's version, Aiken's cover charted within the top 40 of the US Billboard Hot 100, peaking at number 37 in January 2004. It also charted in New Zealand, reaching number 47 in December 2003.

Background and release
Aiken recorded his vocals before D-Side had released their version in the UK. He first went to Child's studio in Miami, when American Idol season two winner Ruben Studdard chided Aiken for wanting to record in a dark studio and not explore the city. After recording the rest of the demo in Minneapolis, Aiken and his coworkers discovered that D-Side had released their version, so they discussed whether to issue the song in the UK. The team decided that the song was too good to defer, and they eventually released the song in the United States on 29 September 2003. In an interview with Billboard, Aiken stated that he wanted to amend the track's lyrics, but he believed that the content could have been much worse and decided to tone down the disturbing message with the video, calling the lyrical content "nasty" and encouraging people not to partake in stalking.

Critical reception
Matt Keohan of online lifestyle publication BroBible called Aiken's version of "Invisible" the "creepiest song ever made", referring to it as "The Stalkers' Anthem". The Baltimore Sun also called the track a "stalker anthem". In 2020, Return of Rock ranked the song as Aiken's best, calling his voice "beautiful".

Chart performance
In the United States, "Invisible" debuted at number 57 on the Billboard Hot 100 in late November 2003. The song remained on the Hot 100 for 20 issues, reaching its peak of number 37 during its ninth week on the chart. The song entered the top 10 on the Adult Contemporary ranking, peaking at number eight, and charted with the top 30 of the Adult Top 40 and Mainstream Top 40 listings. "Invisible" was also released in New Zealand, where "Bridge over Troubled Water" / "This Is the Night" had topped the chart. It appeared on the country's RIANZ Singles Chart for two nonconsecutive weeks in December 2003, peaking at number 47 on both occasions.

Credits and personnel
Credits are lifted from the Measure of a Man album booklet.

Studios
 Recorded at The Gentlemen's Club, The Gallery (Miami, Florida), Storm Studios (Stockholm, Sweden), Red Door Recording Studios (St. Davids, Pennsylvania), and Master Mix Studios (Minneapolis, Minnesota)
 Mixed at Mix This! (Pacific Palisades, Los Angeles)
 Mastered at The Hit Factory (New York City)

Personnel

 Desmond Child – writing, production
 Andreas Carlsson – writing, background vocals, guitar
 Chris Braide – writing, background vocals
 Clay Aiken – vocals, backing vocals
 Chris Willis – background vocals
 Dan Warner – guitar
 Eric Bazilian – guitar, recording
 Marcus Englöf – acoustic guitar, keyboards, programming, recording
 Esbjörn Öhrwall – acoustic guitar
 Thomas Blindberg – bass

 Doug Emery – piano
 Samuel Waermö – keyboards, programming, percussion, recording
 Lee Levin – drums
 Brian Coleman – production management
 Jules Gondar – recording
 Carlos Alvarez – recording
 Craig Lozowick – recording
 Bob Clearmountain – mixing
 Kevin Harp – assistant mix engineer
 Joe Yannece – mastering

Charts

Certifications

Release history

References

2003 singles
2003 songs
Clay Aiken songs
Irish pop songs
RCA Records singles
Song recordings produced by Chris Braide
Song recordings produced by Desmond Child
Songs written by Andreas Carlsson
Songs written by Chris Braide
Songs written by Desmond Child
Warner Music Group singles